Several Canadian naval units have been named HMCS Summerside.
  (I), a Flower-class corvette that served in the Royal Canadian Navy during the Battle of the Atlantic.

Battle honours
Vessels with the name of HMCS Summerside have earned the following battle honours. Battle honours are inherited by ships of the same name.

 Atlantic, 1941–44.
 Gulf of St. Lawrence, 1942, 1944.
 Normandy, 1944.
 English Channel, 1944–45.

References

Royal Canadian Navy ship names